The 44th General Assembly of Prince Edward Island was in session from March 2, 1940, to August 20, 1943. The Liberal Party led by Thane Campbell formed the government. John Walter Jones became premier and party leader in May 1943 after Campbell accepted an appointment as a judge.

Walter F. Alan Stewart was elected speaker.

There were four sessions of the 44th General Assembly:

Members

Kings

Prince

Queens

Notes:

References
  Election results for the Prince Edward Island Legislative Assembly, 1939-05-18
 O'Handley, Kathryn Canadian Parliamentary Guide, 1994 

Terms of the General Assembly of Prince Edward Island
1940 establishments in Prince Edward Island
1943 disestablishments in Prince Edward Island